Alex Brock (born Alexander von Brockdorff), is a British actor, film-maker and former British Army Officer. He has appeared in several high-profile TV dramas, including The Midwich Cuckoos,  FBI: International and the final season of Homeland.

Career
Brock was an officer in the Queen's Royal Hussars, a cavalry regiment of the British Army. He commissioned from the Royal Military Academy Sandhurst in 2008. Having served in combat operations both in Iraq and Afghanistan, he left the Armed Forces in 2014 to start his career as an actor. He shortened his name to Alex Brock around this time. In 2015, he joined with former military colleagues in creating Bare Arms, a company providing military support to the film and television industry. To date, he has appeared mostly in TV drama - including BBC One's Requiem, Channel 4's Baghdad Central and the 8th and final season of Homeland''.

Filmography

Television

Film

Music videos

References

External links

1984 births
Living people
21st-century English male actors
English male television actors
English male film actors
Graduates of the Royal Military Academy Sandhurst